Max Burgin (born 20 May 2002) is a British middle-distance runner specialising in the 800 metres. He won the 800 metres at the 2022 British Athletics Championships in a time of 1:44.54. He ran his personal best time 1:43.52 in Turku, Finland on 14 June 2022 at the Paavo Nurmi Games, which was the fourth fastest British 800 time in history. He also won the 800m at the 2018 European Athletics U18 Championships.

References

2002 births
Living people
British male middle-distance runners